Curzerene is a volatile, aromatic terpenoid found in many herbs and spices, such as Curcuma zeodaria. It is bioactive isolate of Caribbean corals and is also found in myrrh. More specifically it has been found to make up a significant portion - 12.97% - of the smoke produced from burning Commiphora myrrha oleo gum resin.  It is also a major component of myrrh oil, which has been shown in vitro to possess anti-inflammatory properties at sub-toxic by inhibiting the production of the inflammatory cytokine IL-6 by human gingival fibroblasts. Anecdotal evidence exists to support the anti-inflammatory effect of myrrh oil.

Curzerene represents 13.7% of the essential oil extracted from Smyrnium olusatrum, which has demonstrated significant antimicrobial activity in vitro.

References

Sesquiterpenes
Furans
Heterocyclic compounds with 2 rings